Loxocarpus is a genus of flowering plants in the family Gesneriaceae. Many of its species were formerly placed in the genus Henckelia.

Species
Species include:
 Loxocarpus angustifolius Ridl.
 Loxocarpus argenteus L.Burtt
 Loxocarpus burttii T.L.Yao
 Loxocarpus caeruleus (Ridl.) Ridl.
 Loxocarpus caulescens B.L.Burtt
 Loxocarpus conicapsularis (C.B.Clarke) B.L.Burtt
 Loxocarpus coodei (B.L.Burtt) T.L.Yao
 Loxocarpus holttumii M.R. Hend.
 Loxocarpus incanus R.Br.
 L. incanus var. sekayuensis (Banka & Kiew) T.L.Yao
 Loxocarpus litteralis T.L.Yao
 Loxocarpus meijeri B.L.Burtt
 Loxocarpus pauzii T.L.Yao
 Loxocarpus repens B.L.Burtt
 Loxocarpus rufescens (C.B. Clarke) B.L.Burtt
 Loxocarpus segelamensis T.L.Yao
 Loxocarpus semitortus (C.B.Clarke) Ridl.
 Loxocarpus sericeus (Ridl.) B.L.Burtt
 Loxocarpus sericiflavus (Banka & Kiew) T.L.Yao
 Loxocarpus stapfii (Kraenzl.) B.L.Burtt
 Loxocarpus taeniophyllus (B.L.Burtt) T.L.Yao
 Loxocarpus tunkui Kiew
 Loxocarpus verbeniflos (C.B.Clarke) B.L.Burtt
 Loxocarpus violoides (C.B.Clarke) T.L.Yao.

References

Didymocarpoideae
Gesneriaceae genera